Vasyl Anisimov (born 23 January 1938) is a former Soviet-Ukrainian hurdler and sprinter. He competed in the men's 400 metres hurdles and the men's 4 × 400 metres relay at the 1964 Summer Olympics.

References

External links

1938 births
Living people
Athletes (track and field) at the 1964 Summer Olympics
Soviet male sprinters
Soviet male hurdlers
Ukrainian male sprinters
Ukrainian male hurdlers
Olympic athletes of the Soviet Union